Jean Veillot (died before 1662) was a French composer and priest.

In 1640, he succeeded Henry Frémart as maître de chapelle at Notre-Dame de Paris then replaced François Cosset, when he took charge in 1643 as sous-maître of the Chapelle royale. After the death of Eustache Picot in 1651, he undertook duties alternating with Thomas Gobert.

Works 
Three motets for double choir

Bibliography 
Marcelle Benoît, Versailles et les musiciens du Roi, 1661-1733 : étude institutionnelle et sociale. Paris: Picard, 1971.
Michel Brenet (pseud. of Marie Bobillier, Les musiciens de la Sainte-Chapelle du Palais : documents inédits, recueillis et annotés. Paris, A. Picard, 1910.
Yolande de Brossard, Musiciens de Paris 1535-1792, d'après le fichier Laborde. Paris: Picard, 1965.
Yolande de Brossard. La vie musicale en France d’après Loret et ses continuateurs, 1650-1688. Recherches sur la musique française classique 10 (1970) (pp. 117–193).
John Burke: "Sacred music at Notre-Dame-des-Victoires under Mazarin and Louis XIV", Recherches sur la musique française classique 20 (1981), (pp. 19–44).
François Léon Chartier. L’ancien chapitre de Notre-Dame de Paris et sa maîtrise d’après les capitulaires (1326–1790) avec un appendice musical.... Paris: 1897.
 Madeleine Jurgens. Documents du Minutier central concernant l’histoire de la musique (1600–1650). Tome premier [études I – X]. Paris: 1967.
Denise Launay, Les motets à double choeur en France dans la première moitié du XVIIe siècle,  39-40 (1957), (pp. 173–195).
Denise Launay, A propos de deux manuscrits musicaux aux armes de Louis XIII, Fontes artis musicæ 13 (1966/1), (pp. 63–67).
Denise Launay, La musique religieuse en France du Concile de Trente à 1804. Paris: Société française de musicologie, 1993.
Catherine Massip, La Vie des musiciens de Paris au temps de Mazarin (1643-1661): essai d'étude sociale. Paris: Picard, 1976.
Henri Sauval, Histoire et recherches des antiquités de la ville de Paris, tome premier. Paris, 1724. Digitalized on Internet Archive.

References 

French Baroque composers
French composers of sacred music
French male composers
1660s deaths
Year of birth unknown
17th-century male musicians